History of Tripoli may refer to:

 History of Tripoli, Lebanon, a city in Lebanon
 History of Tripoli, Libya, a city in Libya
 History of the County of Tripoli, a crusader state